Brookstead is a rural town and locality in the Toowoomba Region, Queensland, Australia.

Geography 

The town is located in the south-west of the locality. The North Branch of the Condamine River forms the western boundary of the locality. The land is flat freehold farmland (approx 400 metres above sea level) and is used to grow crops, such as sorgum, corn and wheat.

St Ronans is a neighbourhood in the west of the locality.

The Gore Highway traverses the locality from the south-east to the south-west slightly bypassing the town. At the bypass is the junction with the Brookstead Norworth Road which exits the locality through the north-west. The Millmerran railway line also traverses from the south-east to the south-west through the locality, passing through the town, which is serviced by the Brookstead railway station.

History 
The name Brookstead is derived from brook indicating creek/watercourse, and stede (Dutch) or stadt (German) indicating place, together meaning a creek-side camping place.

Brookstead State School open on 25 January 1915.

The foundation stone ceremony for St Matthews Anglican Church was held on Sunday 26 August 1923 with Archdeacon Osborne officiating. The church was opened and dedicated by the Venerable Alfred Davies on 30 March 1924. Its closure in circa 2014 was approved by Bishop Cameron Venables.

Education 
Brookstead State School is a government primary (Prep-6) school for boys and girls at 30 Ware Street. In 2016, the school had enrolment of 32 children with 5 teachers (3 full-time equivalent) and 6 non-teaching staff (3 full-time equivalent). In 2018, the school had an enrolment of 25 students with 5 teachers (3 full-time equivalent) and 4 non-teaching staff (2 full-time equivalent).

There is no secondary school in Brookstead. The nearest is Pittsworth State High School in Pittsworth to the east.

References

Further reading

External links 

 Town map of Brookstead, 1976

Towns in Queensland
Toowoomba Region
Localities in Queensland